Victoria Mountbatten, Marchioness of Milford Haven  (born Princess Victoria of Hesse and by Rhine; 5 April 1863 – 24 September 1950) was the eldest daughter of Louis IV, Grand Duke of Hesse and by Rhine, and Princess Alice of the United Kingdom, daughter of Queen Victoria of the United Kingdom and Prince Albert of Saxe-Coburg and Gotha.

Born in Windsor Castle in the presence of her maternal grandmother, Princess Victoria was raised in Germany and England. Her mother died while Victoria's brother and sisters were still young, which placed her in an early position of responsibility over her siblings. Over her father's disapproval, she married his morganatic first cousin Prince Louis of Battenberg, an officer in the United Kingdom's Royal Navy, and lived most of her married life in various parts of Europe at her husband's naval posts and visiting her many royal relations. She was perceived by her family as liberal in outlook, straightforward, practical and bright. 

During World War I, she and her husband abandoned their German titles and adopted the surname of Mountbatten, which was an English translation of the German "Battenberg". Two of her sisters—Elisabeth and Alix, who had married into the Russian imperial family—were killed by communist revolutionaries. She was the mother of Queen Louise of Sweden and the British statesman and Royal Navy officer Louis Mountbatten; the maternal grandmother of Prince Philip, Duke of Edinburgh, consort of Queen Elizabeth II; and paternal great-grandmother of King Charles III.

Early life

Victoria was born on Easter Sunday at Windsor Castle in the presence of her maternal grandmother, Queen Victoria. She was christened in the Lutheran faith in the Green Drawing Room at Windsor Castle, in the arms of the Queen on 27 April. Her godparents were Queen Victoria, Princess Mary Adelaide of Cambridge, Louis III, Grand Duke of Hesse and by Rhine (represented by Prince Alexander of Hesse and by Rhine), the Prince of Wales and Prince Heinrich of Hesse and by Rhine.

Her early life was spent at Bessungen, a suburb of Darmstadt, until the family moved to the New Palace in Darmstadt when she was three years old. There, she shared a room with her younger sister, Elisabeth, until adulthood. She was privately educated to a high standard and was, throughout her life, an avid reader.

During the Prussian invasion of Hesse in June 1866, Victoria and Elisabeth were sent to Britain to live with their grandmother until hostilities were ended by the absorption of Hesse-Kassel and parts of Hesse-Darmstadt into Prussia. During the Franco-Prussian War of 1870, military hospitals were set up in the palace grounds at Darmstadt, and she helped in the soup kitchens with her mother. She remembered the intense cold of the winter, and being burned on the arm by hot soup.

In 1872, Victoria's eighteen-month-old brother, Friedrich, was diagnosed with haemophilia. The diagnosis came as a shock to the royal families of Europe; it had been twenty years since Queen Victoria had given birth to her haemophiliac son, Prince Leopold, Duke of Albany, and it was the first indication that the bleeding disorder in the royal family was hereditary. The following year, Friedrich fell from a window onto stone steps and died. It was the first of many tragedies to beset the Hesse family.

In early November 1878, Victoria contracted diphtheria. Elisabeth was swiftly moved out of their room and was the only member of the family to escape the disease. For days, Victoria's mother, Princess Alice, nursed the sick, but she was unable to save her youngest daughter, Victoria's sister Marie, who died in mid-November. Just as the rest of the family seemed to have recovered, Princess Alice fell ill. She died on 14 December, the anniversary of the death of her father, Prince Albert. As the eldest child, Victoria partly assumed the role of mother to the younger children and of companion to her father. She later wrote, "My mother's death was an irreparable loss ... My childhood ended with her death, for I became the eldest and most responsible."

Marriage and family
At family gatherings, Victoria had often met Prince Louis of Battenberg, who was her first cousin once removed and a member of a morganatic branch of the Hessian royal family. Prince Louis had adopted British nationality and was serving as an officer in the Royal Navy. In the winter of 1882, they met again at Darmstadt, and were engaged the following summer.

After a brief postponement because of the death of her maternal uncle Prince Leopold, Duke of Albany, Victoria married Prince Louis on 30 April 1884 at Darmstadt. Her father did not approve of the match; in his view Prince Louis—his own first cousin—had little money and would deprive him of his daughter's company, as the couple would naturally live abroad in Britain. However, Victoria was of an independent mind and took little notice of her father's displeasure. Remarkably, that same evening, Victoria's father secretly married his mistress, Countess Alexandrine von Hutten-Czapska, the former wife of Alexander von Kolemine, the Russian chargé d'affaires in Darmstadt. His marriage to a divorcee who was not of equal rank shocked the assembled royalty of Europe and through diplomatic and family pressure Victoria's father was forced to seek an annulment of his own marriage.

Over the next sixteen years, Victoria and her husband had four children:

They lived in a succession of houses at Chichester, Sussex, Walton-on-Thames, and Schloss Heiligenberg, Jugenheim. When Prince Louis was serving with the Mediterranean Fleet, she spent some winters in Malta. In 1887, she contracted typhoid but, after being nursed through her illness by her husband, was sufficiently recovered by June to attend Queen Victoria's Golden Jubilee celebrations in London. She was interested in science and drew a detailed geological map of Malta and also participated in archaeological digs both on the island and in Germany. In leather-bound volumes she kept meticulous records of books she had read, which reveal a wide range of interests, including socialist philosophy.

She personally taught her own children and exposed them to new ideas and inventions. She gave lessons to her younger son, Louis, until he was ten years of age. He said of her in 1968 that she was "a walking encyclopedia. All through her life she stored up knowledge on all sorts of subjects, and she had the great gift of being able to make it all interesting when she taught it to me. She was completely methodical; we had time-tables for each subject, and I had to do preparation, and so forth. She taught me to enjoy working hard, and to be thorough. She was outspoken and open-minded to a degree quite unusual in members of the Royal Family. And she was also entirely free from prejudice about politics or colour and things of that kind."

In 1906, she flew in a Zeppelin airship, and even more daringly later flew in a biplane even though it was "not made to carry passengers, and we perched securely attached on a little stool holding on to the flyer's back." Up until 1914, Victoria regularly visited her relatives abroad in both Germany and Russia, including her two sisters who had married into the Russian imperial family: Elisabeth, who had married Grand Duke Sergei Alexandrovich, and Alix, who had married Emperor Nicholas II. Victoria was one of the Empress's relatives who tried to persuade her away from the influence of Rasputin. On the outbreak of war between Germany and Britain in 1914, Victoria and her daughter, Louise, were in Russia at Yekaterinburg. By train and steamer, they travelled to St Petersburg and from there through Tornio to Stockholm. They sailed from Bergen, Norway, on "the last ship" back to Britain.

Later life

Prince Louis was forced to resign from the navy at the start of the war when his German origins became an embarrassment, and the couple retired for the war years to Kent House on the Isle of Wight, which Victoria had been given by her aunt Princess Louise, Duchess of Argyll. Victoria blamed her husband's forced resignation on the Government "who few greatly respect or trust". She distrusted the First Lord of the Admiralty, Winston Churchill, because she thought him unreliable—he had once borrowed a book and failed to return it. Continued public hostility to Germany led King George V of the United Kingdom to renounce his German titles, and at the same time on 14 July 1917 Prince Louis and Victoria renounced theirs, assuming an anglicised version of Battenberg—Mountbatten—as their surname. Four months later Louis was re-ennobled by the King as Marquess of Milford Haven. During the war, Victoria's two sisters, Alix and Elisabeth, were murdered in the Russian revolution, and her brother, Ernest Louis, Grand Duke of Hesse, was deposed. On her last visit to Russia in 1914, Victoria had driven past the very house in Yekaterinburg where Alix would be murdered. In January 1921, after a long and convoluted journey, Elisabeth's body was interred in Jerusalem in Victoria's presence. Alix's body was never recovered during Victoria's lifetime.

Victoria's husband died in London in September 1921. After meeting her at the Naval and Military Club in Piccadilly, he complained of feeling unwell and Victoria persuaded him to rest in a room they had booked in the club annexe. She called a doctor, who prescribed some medicine, and Victoria went out to fill the prescription at a nearby pharmacy. When she came back, Louis was dead. On her widowhood, Victoria moved into a grace-and-favour residence at Kensington Palace and, in the words of her biographer, "became a central matriarchal figure in the lives of Europe's surviving royalty". In 1930, her eldest daughter, Alice, suffered a nervous breakdown and was diagnosed as schizophrenic. In the following decade Victoria was largely responsible for her grandson Prince Philip's education and upbringing during his parents' separation and his mother's institutionalisation. Prince Philip recalled, "I liked my grandmother very much and she was always helpful. She was very good with children ... she took the practical approach to them. She treated them in the right way—the right combination of the rational and the emotional."

In 1937, Victoria's brother, Ernest Louis, died and soon afterwards her widowed sister-in-law, nephew, granddaughter and two of her great-grandchildren all died in an air crash at Ostend. Victoria's granddaughter, Princess Cecilie of Greece and Denmark, had married Victoria's nephew (Ernest Louis's son), George Donatus of Hesse. They and their two young sons, Louis and Alexander, were all killed. Cecilie's youngest child, Johanna, who was not on the plane, was adopted by her uncle Prince Louis of Hesse and by Rhine but the little girl only survived her parents and older brothers by eighteen months, dying in 1939 of meningitis.

Further tragedy soon followed when Victoria's son, George, died of bone cancer the following year. Her granddaughter, Lady Pamela Hicks, remembered her grandmother's tears. In World War II Victoria was bombed out of Kensington Palace, and spent some time at Windsor Castle with King George VI. Her surviving son (Louis) and her two grandsons (David Mountbatten and Prince Philip) served in the Royal Navy, while her German relations fought with the opposing forces. She spent most of her time reading and worrying about her children; her daughter, Alice, remained in occupied Greece and was unable to communicate with her mother for four years at the height of the war. After the Allied victory, her son, Louis, was made Viscount Mountbatten of Burma. He was offered the post of Viceroy of India, but she was deeply opposed to his accepting, knowing that the position would be dangerous and difficult; he accepted anyway.

On 15 December 1948, the Dowager Marchioness attended the christening of her great-grandson, Prince Charles.  She was one of eight sponsors or godparents, along with King George VI, King Haakon VII of Norway, Queen Mary, Princess Margaret, Prince George of Greece and Denmark, Lady Brabourne, and David Bowes-Lyon.

She fell ill with bronchitis (she had smoked since the age of sixteen) at Lord Mountbatten's home at Broadlands, Hampshire, in the summer of 1950. Saying "it is better to die at home", Victoria moved back to Kensington Palace, where she died on 24 September aged 87. She was buried four days later in the grounds of St. Mildred's Church, Whippingham on the Isle of Wight.

Legacy
With the help of her lady-in-waiting, Baroness Sophie Buxhoeveden, Victoria wrote a memoir, held in the Mountbatten archive at the University of Southampton, which remains an interesting source for royal historians. A selection of Queen Victoria's letters to Victoria have been published with a commentary by Richard Hough and an introduction by Victoria's granddaughter, Patricia Mountbatten.

Lord Mountbatten remembered her fondly: "My mother was very quick on the uptake, very talkative, very aggressive and argumentative. With her marvellous brain she sharpened people's wits." Her granddaughter thought her "formidable, but never intimidating ... a supremely honest woman, full of commonsense and modesty." Victoria wrote her own typically forthright epitaph at the end of her life in letters to and conversation with her son: "What will live in history is the good work done by the individual & that has nothing to do with rank or title ... I never thought I would be known only as your mother. You're so well known now and no one knows about me, and I don't want them to."

Honours
 : Dame of the Order of the Golden Lion, 1 January 1883
 : Red Cross Medal, 1st Class
 : Dame Grand Cross of the Order of St. Catherine
 :
 Queen Victoria Golden Jubilee Medal, 1887
 Royal Order of Victoria and Albert, 1st Class

Ancestry

References

Further reading

  A "sisters" biography of the four surviving daughters of Princess Alice, Grand Duchess of Hesse and by Rhine, told from the point of view of Princess Victoria.

External links

St. Mildred's Church, Whippingham, Isle of Wight
The Mountbatten Archive at the University of Southampton

1863 births
1950 deaths
Milford Haven, Victoria
German princesses
Burials at St. Mildred's Church, Whippingham
Battenberg family
House of Hesse-Darmstadt
Ladies of the Royal Order of Victoria and Albert
People from Windsor, Berkshire
Daughters of monarchs